Lily Anggreny (born September 15, 1960) is a retired German wheelchair racer who has competed in three Summer Paralympic Games and two Summer Olympic Games. She was the tenth child of Chinese parents then emigrated to Germany aged 19. She studied English and sinology in Germany. In 2008, she switched to handcycling.

References

1960 births
Living people
Paralympic athletes of Germany
Sportspeople from Wuppertal
German people of Indonesian descent
Athletes (track and field) at the 1992 Summer Paralympics
Athletes (track and field) at the 1996 Summer Paralympics
Athletes (track and field) at the 2000 Summer Paralympics
Medalists at the 1992 Summer Paralympics
Medalists at the 1996 Summer Paralympics
Athletes (track and field) at the 1996 Summer Olympics
Athletes (track and field) at the 2000 Summer Olympics
Paralympic medalists in athletics (track and field)
Paralympic gold medalists for Germany
Paralympic silver medalists for Germany
Paralympic bronze medalists for Germany
German wheelchair racers